Nicole Miller (born 1952) is an American fashion designer.

Nicole Miller may also refer to

Nicole Miller (artist) (born 1982), American artist
Nicole Miller (Shortland Street), a fictional television character
Nicole Miller (Whistler), a fictional television character
Nicole Miller (politician), an Oklahoma politician

See also
 Nicole Millar
 Miller (name)
 List of people with surname Miller
 Miller (disambiguation)